Jan Lowell ( Englund; August 23, 1927 – January 16, 2018) was an American screenwriter and actress known for her work on exploitation films from the 1950s through the 1970s. She often worked alongside her husband, writer-actor Mark Lowell.

After marrying her husband, she began working as an actress for stage and screen. Her first acting roles came in a series of Hugo Haas films in the mid-1950s. Soon, they were writing film scripts for B-movies like High School Hellcats and His and Hers. The pair also spent a significant amount of time living in Rome, where they worked on spaghetti Westerns like A Fistful of Dollars.

Selected filmography 
As an actress:

 The "Human" Factor (1975)
 Paradise Alley (1962)
 Suicide Battalion (1958)
 Reform School Girl (1957)
 Invasion of the Saucer Men (1957)
 Lizzie (1957)
 Hit and Run (1957)
 Emergency Hospital (1956)
 Hold Back Tomorrow (1955)
 The Other Woman (1954)
 Bait (1954)

As a writer:

 A Candidate for Killing (1969)
 A Quiet Business (1964)
 A Fistful of Dollars (1964) (uncredited)
 His and Hers (1961)
 Diary of a High School Bride (1959)
 High School Hellcats (1958)

References 

American women screenwriters
1927 births
2018 deaths
21st-century American women